The 1962 Baltimore Orioles season involved the Orioles finishing 7th in the American League with a record of 77 wins and 85 losses.

Offseason 
 October 9, 1961: Dave Philley was released by the Orioles.
 November 16, 1961: Harry Chiti, Ray Barker and Art Kay (minors) were traded by the Orioles to the Cleveland Indians for Johnny Temple.
 November 27, 1961: 1961 rule 5 draft
Bo Belinsky was drafted from the Orioles by the Los Angeles Angels.
John Anderson was drafted from the Orioles by the St. Louis Cardinals.

Regular season

Season standings

Record vs. opponents

Notable transactions 
 April 24, 1962: Darrell Johnson was signed by Orioles as a free agent.
 May 9, 1962: Marv Throneberry was sold by the Orioles to the New York Mets. 
 June 7, 1962 The New York Mets sell Hobie Landrith to the Orioles. 
 June 19, 1962: Mark Belanger was signed as an amateur free agent by the Orioles.
 August 11, 1962: Johnny Temple was acquired from the Orioles by the Houston Colt .45s in exchange for cash.
 September 7, 1962: Hal Brown was acquired from the Orioles by the New York Yankees in exchange for cash.

Roster

Player stats

Batting

Starters by position 
Note: Pos = Position; G = Games played; AB = At bats; H = Hits; Avg. = Batting average; HR = Home runs; RBI = Runs batted in

Other batters 
Note: G = Games played; AB = At bats; H = Hits; Avg. = Batting average; HR = Home runs; RBI = Runs batted in

Pitching

Starting pitchers 
Note: G = Games pitched; IP = Innings pitched; W = Wins; L = Losses; ERA = Earned run average; SO = Strikeouts

Other pitchers 
Note: G = Games pitched; IP = Innings pitched; W = Wins; L = Losses; ERA = Earned run average; SO = Strikeouts

Relief pitchers 
Note: G = Games pitched; W = Wins; L = Losses; SV = Saves; ERA = Earned run average; SO = Strikeouts

Farm system 

LEAGUE CHAMPIONS: Bluefield

Notes

References 

1962 Baltimore Orioles team page at Baseball Reference
1962 Baltimore Orioles season at baseball-almanac.com

Baltimore Orioles seasons
Baltimore Orioles season
Baltimore Orioles